Slipstream is a short-film about bicycle racers directed by Steven Spielberg and written by Spielberg and Roger Ernest. The film remains unfinished. Ernest later appeared in Spielberg's The Sugarland Express and Close Encounters of the Third Kind. Slipstream also co-starred Tony Bill, who was already an established actor, and Jim Baxes, who went on to co-star in 1975 in the TV show SWAT under the stage name James Coleman.

While preparing to shoot Slipstream, Spielberg's assistant director on the project, Peter R. J. Deyell, introduced him to aspiring cinematographer Allen Daviau, who was working at Studio City Camera, a motion picture equipment rental facility. Spielberg hired Daviau to shoot Slipstream, and years later Daviau would again collaborate with the now-established Spielberg on three feature-length films: E.T. the Extra-Terrestrial, The Color Purple and Empire of the Sun.

Relatively inexperienced at the time, Spielberg believed that Slipstream could be made for $5,000. Despite getting equipment, film and services donated, he soon ran out of money and ended production.

References

External links
 

Films directed by Steven Spielberg
1960s unfinished films
Cycling films
American drama short films
American sports drama films
1960s American films